Nellie Bly was a steam-powered tugboat that served a number of roles in Ontario, Canada.

She was operated in Toronto, performing regular harbour duties, and also serving as a fireboat.
She played a role in fighting an important fire in 1906.

Later she was owned by a series of timber companies, that used her to tow logs and scows of logging byproducts on the Magnetawan River and its tributaries.  She ran aground and was holed on a rock on Duck Lake, but was quickly repaired.
 

References

Steamships of Ontario
Fireboats of Toronto Fire Services